Mike DiBiase may refer to:

Iron Mike DiBiase (1923–1969), American wrestler
Mike DiBiase (born 1977), American wrestler